Timbaúba is a city in Pernambuco, Brazil. According to the Brazilian Institute of Geography and Statistics, it has an estimated population of 52,802 inhabitants as of 2020.

Geography
 State - Pernambuco
 Region - Zona da mata Pernambucana
 Boundaries - Paraiba state (N); Vicência (S); Macaparana (W); Aliança, Ferreiros and Camutanga (E)
 Area - 289.51 km2
 Elevation - 102 m
 Hydrography - Goiana River
 Vegetation - Subcaducifólia forest
 Climate - Hot tropical and humid
 Annual average temperature - 24.6 c
 Distance to Recife - 96 km

Economy
The main economic activities in Timbaúba are based in commerce and agribusiness, especially growing sugarcane and bananas, and raising livestock such as cattle, sheep and goats.

Economic indicators

Economy by sector
2006

Health indicators

Sports
The main sport in Timbaúba is football, which is represented by Timbaúba Futebol Clube, currently playing the Campeonato Pernambucano's Série A2.

References

Municipalities in Pernambuco